Taladrid is one of eleven parishes (administrative divisions) in the municipality of Ibias, within the province and autonomous community of Asturias, in northern Spain.

Villages and hamlets
 Taladrid Population 2011 - 9
 Llanelo  Population 2011 - 6
 Villaoril Population 2011 - 12
 Villardecendias Population 2011 - 18
 Villarin Population 2011 - 8
 Villarmeirin Population 2011 - 9

References

Parishes in Ibias